Nik Schröter (born 12 June 1998) is a German track cyclist. He won a bronze medal in the team sprint event at the 2021 UCI Track Cycling World Championships.

References

External links

1998 births
Living people
German male cyclists
German track cyclists
People from Finsterwalde
Cyclists from Brandenburg